Yasmin Parsons (born 13 July 1993) is an English netball player who plays for England and for the Surrey Storm in the positions of centre or wing attack. She was appointed as the captain of the national team for the 2019 European Netball Championship which was held in September 2019 in Belfast where England were crowned as the winners.

Career 
Yasmin has played for few English club teams including the Team Bath from 2011 to 2015 and was a member of the Team Bath which emerged champions during the 2013 Netball Superleague season. She made her Surrey Storm debut in 2016 and also won a Netball Superleague title on her first Superleague season with the team in 2016.

References 

1993 births
Living people
English netball players
Netball Superleague players
Team Bath netball players
Alumni of the University of Bath
Surrey Storm players